Tesla, Inc. is an American electric car and clean energy company which employs over 110,000 workers across its global operations, without using trade unions.  Tesla was the only major American auto manufacturer without a union in the United States, as well as in Germany. Tesla CEO Elon Musk has commented negatively on trade unions in relation to Tesla.

United States 

In 2010, Tesla acquired the formerly unionized NUMMI plant in Fremont, California which was rebranded as the Tesla Fremont Factory. By 2016, Tesla was the only US auto manufacturer to not be represented by a union. In the Fall of 2016, Jose Moran, a Tesla employee reached out to the United Auto Worker (UAW), going public with a "Fair Future at Tesla" campaign in February 2017, citing high injury rates, long hours and below industry pay as motivations. In 2016, UAW also indicated its interest in unionizing Tesla, spending over $400,000 on organizing, campaigning and National Labor Relations Board (NLRB) complaints by 2018. In October 2017, Tesla fired Richard Ortiz, which the NLRB later ruled to be illegal retaliation.

One year later in 2018, Elon Musk posted a tweet "Nothing stopping Tesla team at our car plant from voting union. Could do so  if they wanted. But why pay union dues & give up stock options for nothing? …". Musk was ordered to delete that tweet and offer Ortiz his job back with back pay. Additionally they would have to put up a notice in all of its US factories addressing the unlawful tweet.  the Ortiz case had been appealed to the United States Court of Appeals for the Fifth Circuit.

In March 2022 Musk invited the United Auto Workers (UAW) union to hold a vote at their convenience. Later, in June 2022, a CNBC report found that Tesla paid MikeWorldWide to monitor a Tesla employee Facebook group and to conduct research on Tesla union organizers on social media from 2017 to 2018. MikeWorldWide monitored discussions on social networks alleging unfair labor practices at Tesla and monitored discussions on a sexual harassment lawsuit. Former and current Tesla employees told CNBC that they believe the company continues to monitor its workers on social media.

In February 2023, workers at Gigafactory New York in Buffalo involved with labeling data for Tesla Autopilot announced a unionization effort with Workers United. Workers United is the same union that successfully led the union drive at the nearby Starbucks store in Buffalo. A day after the announcement, a complaint was lodged with the National Labor Relations Board against Tesla for supposedly firing employees who participated in the Workers United organization.

Germany 
Tesla is one of the few auto manufacturers in Germany that is neither unionized, nor a member of the Employer Association. Because electric vehicle production requires 30 percent fewer workers than traditional combustion-engine vehicles, a non-unionized Tesla weakens the IG Metall union's bargaining power in the overall automotive sector.

Grohmann 
In 2017, Tesla acquired Grohmann Engineering. IG Metall and the Works Council Chair Uwe Herzig of Grohmann Engineering stated that wages under Tesla were 25‒30 percent below the Metal Industry ("") collective agreements. Employees expressed concern after former CEO Klaus Grohmann was ousted and business contracts with other firms were cancelled.

By October 2017, Tesla and the Tesla Grohmann employees came to an agreement that set their salaries on par with the Metal Industry collective agreements without explicitly signing the agreement. While IG Metall still pushes for formal ratification, it indicated there have been "good negotiation results," citing threats of strikes and internal pressure to bolster the agreements.

Giga Berlin 
According to IG Metall, Tesla was offering employees at the new Giga Berlin facility, wages twenty percent below the collective agreement standards provided at other automotive facilities in Germany. On November 22, 2021, seven non-union employees of Tesla's Giga Berlin factory initiated a Works Council proceeding.

IG Metall displayed cautious optimism about the proceeding and cited a concern about the Works Council being dominated by management as only the earlier employees would be eligible to run as candidates and the majority of the 1,800 hires were middle management personnel.

In total, Tesla plans to hire 12,000 employees and, if the number of employees were to double, the next Works Council election would be two years later instead of four. On March 2, 2022, the Works Council was established. Nearly half of the votes went to the managerial friendly "Gigavoice" list.

In 2023, IG Metall called for an investigation into the car company after stating that workers had called the organization to report that they were being made to work longer hours, with less time between shifts.

IG Metall also stated that workers were being forced to sign non-disclosure agreements alongside their regular work contracts and were therefore scared of discussing their work conditions in the open for fear of retribution.

Netherlands 
In March 2021, rumors were leaked to Brabants Dagblad that Tesla would shut down its Tilburg plant and lay off 96 of its 450 employees, because it no longer made sense to continue re-assembling the Tesla X and S models. By July 2021, according to the Federation of Dutch Trade Unions, forty employees accepted voluntary redundancy, with no further announced layoffs or organizational restructuring.

See also 
 Volkswagen worker organizations

References

External links 
 Tesla worker rights
 IG Metall bei Tesla
Fair Future Tesla
Tesla Workers United

Tesla, Inc. people
Tesla, Inc.
Tesla
United Auto Workers
Automotive industry in the United States
Automotive industry in Germany
Labor relations in Germany
Labor relations in California